Hustle is an unincorporated community in Essex County, in the U.S. state of Virginia.

History
A post office called Hustle has been in operation since 1909. The community was so named by a pickle vendor whose customers would "hustle" in to buy his product.

References

Unincorporated communities in Virginia
Unincorporated communities in Essex County, Virginia